Wakadi is a village in Rahata taluka of Ahmednagar district in Indian state of Maharashtra. It has a temple dedicated to the Hindu deity Khandoba.It has a higher secondary school named 'shri Laxmi Narayan vidyalay' located in mid of town.

Demographics
The 2011 Census of India recorded the population of Wakadi as being 11,930, of which 6.185 were males.

Transport

Road
Wakadi is connected to Shirdi and Shrirampur by Shirdi-Shingnapur state highway.

Rail
Chitali station is the nearest railway station to village.

Air
Shirdi Airport is nearest airport to village at distance of 27 km.

See also
List of villages in Rahata taluka

References 

Villages in Ahmednagar district